Myron Walden (born October 18, 1972) is a jazz saxophonist, flutist, and bass clarinetist.

Biography
Born in Miami, Florida, Walden moved to The Bronx at the age of 12.  His interest in the alto saxophone developed when he witnessed the close attention his uncle paid to the Charlie Parker record One Night In Washington.  Walden was able to procure an alto sax from his middle school music appreciation teacher, and a saxophone player who lived in his building gave him an instruction book.  Walden was self-taught until he enrolled in the LaGuardia High School of Music & Art, where he met frequent collaborators Dwayne Burno and Eric McPherson.  Walden went on to attend the Manhattan School of Music, and in 1993 won first place in a Charlie Parker competition, which earned him a guest spot with Wynton Marsalis and the Jazz at Lincoln Center Orchestra.

Walden began his professional career playing with Roy Hargrove's big band at the Jazz Gallery in 1995, then performed at Smalls with artists such as Kurt Rosenwinkel, Eddie Henderson, Kevin Hays, Stephen Scott, Greg Hutchinson and Eric Harland before earning a regular gig on Wednesday nights with his Apex Trio, featuring McPherson (drums) and Burno (bass).  Walden primarily played his own original compositions with the Apex Trio, and recorded four solo albums between 1996 and 2005.  During this period, he became a member of Brian Blade's Fellowship Band and The New Jazz Composers Octet, which made three recordings as a unit and two with Freddie Hubbard (with whom they performed several times at the Iridium).  Walden took a nearly five-year break from recording as a leader in order to develop his skills on the tenor and soprano saxophones while composing specifically for those instruments.  In 2009, he hired Shore Fire Media to promote his new projects, playing five Wednesday nights with five different bands in September at the Jazz Gallery (with all proceeds going to the non-profit venue), and releasing seven albums on his new record label, Demi Sound, over the course of 2009 and 2010.

Playing style and critical reception
According to JazzTimes, Walden "plays with a Phoenix-like virtuosity and an attention to rhythmic detail rarely heard among saxophone players".  All About Jazz cites him as "one of the true bright stars of his generation" who "has a very distinctive sharp tone with a rounded nasaly-inflection" and "has shown the ability to develop solos with both an incisive logic and an organic level of invention."  Describing his performance on tenor sax, writer John Kelman said that Walden was "as thoughtful yet fiery a player on the bigger horn as he is on alto" and called his 2009 release Momentum "a document of one of the modern mainstream's most provocative saxophonists, composers, and bandleaders," favorably comparing Walden's composition "Like a Flower Seeking the Sun" to Wayne Shorter's title track from Miles Davis's album Nefertiti.  Writing in Down Beat magazine, Ted Panken describes Walden as "a widely respected musician's musician with a keening, instantly recognizable voice."  Walden frequently plays in a pianoless trio or quartet format, though his 2010 album Countyfied featured an organ trio, the sound of which Walden described as "Southern-fried soul meets a little blues and rock 'n' roll," and his dual In This World releases took a "harmonically fortified quiet storm" approach (according to Panken) with a quintet featuring guitarist Mike Moreno and keyboardist Jon Cowherd, among others.

Discography

As leader
Hypnosis (NYC Music, 1996)
Like a Flower Seeking the Sun (NYC Music, 1999)
Apex Live: Volume One (Demi Sound, 1999)
Apex Live: Volume Two (Demi Sound, 1999)
Higher Ground (Fresh Sound New Talent, 2002)
This Way (Fresh Sound New Talent, 2005)
Momentum (Demi Sound, 2009)
Momentum Live (Demi Sound, 2009)
In This World: What We Share (Demi Sound, 2010)
In This World: To Feel (Demi Sound, 2010)
Countryfied (Demi Sound, 2010)
Momentum Live; Our Sound (Demi Sound, 2014)

As sideman
Spirits in the Night - Dan Faulk (Fresh Sound New Talent, 1997)
Brian Blade Fellowship - Brian Blade (Blue Note, 1998)
First Steps into Reality - The New Jazz Composers Octet (Fresh Sound New Talent, 1999)
Premonition - Jason Lindner (MCA, 2000)
Perceptual - Brian Blade (Blue Note, 2000)
New Colors - Freddie Hubbard (Hip Bop Essence, 2001)
Wise Children - Tom Harrell (Bluebird, 2003)
Walkin' the Line - The New Jazz Composers Octet (Fresh Sound New Talent, 2003)
Treats for the Nightwalker - Josh Roseman (Enja, 2003)
Salt - Lizz Wright (Verve, 2003)
Insight - Jeremy Pelt (Criss Cross Jazz, 2003)
Mirror - David Weiss (Fresh Sound New Talent, 2004)
Attack of Wren: Wrenaissance Volume One - Darren Barrett (Nagel Heyer, 2004)
Time Was - Time Is - Ray Barretto (O+ Music, 2005)
Late August - Gregg August (Iacuessa, 2005)
Identity - Jeremy Pelt (MAXJAZZ, 2005)
The Source - Kendrick Scott Oracle (World Culture, 2007)
Metalix - Matthias Lupri (Summit, 2006)
Interwords - Dan McCarthy (2006)
Asking No Permission - Omer Avital (Smalls, 2006)
Room to Grow - Omer Avital (Smalls, 2007)
One Peace - Gregg August (Iacuessa, 2007)
The Turning Gate - The New Jazz Composers Octet (Motéma, 2008)
Season of Changes - Brian Blade (Verve, 2008)
On the Real Side - Freddie Hubbard (Times Square, 2008)
After Hours (Moonlamps & Other Ballads) - Matthias Lupri (Summit, 2010)
Landmarks - Brian Blade (Blue Note, 2014)
When Words Fail - David Weiss (Motéma, 2014)
Live and Direct - Darren Barrett dB Quintet (DB Studios, 2014)

References

1972 births
Living people
American jazz saxophonists
American male saxophonists
American jazz clarinetists
Musicians from Miami
Fiorello H. LaGuardia High School alumni
Manhattan School of Music alumni
Jazz musicians from New York (state)
21st-century American saxophonists
21st-century clarinetists
21st-century American male musicians
American male jazz musicians
The New Jazz Composers Octet members